Be Good is a 2005 album by Alex Fong (方力申).

Track listing
ABC君 (Mr. ABC)
自欺欺人 ft. 傅穎 (Self-Deception)
我們不是朋友 (We Are Not Friends)
密碼 (Password)
石像 (Statue)
自導自戀 (Directing Your Own Love)
好走 (Better Go)
希望我聽錯 (I Hope I Didn't Hear That)
你記得嗎? (Do You Remember?)
幸福家庭  (Happy Family)

2005 albums
Alex Fong (singer) albums